For United States federal law, the GAO Human Capital Reform Act of 2004 provides new human capital flexibilities with respect to the Government Accountability Office, and for other purposes.  The most visible provision of the law was to change the name of the organization from the General Accounting Office, which it had been known as since its founding in 1921, to the Government Accountability Office.  Besides the name change, the law:

 Decouples GAO from the federal employee pay system,
 Establishes a compensation system that places greater emphasis on job performance while protecting the purchasing power of employees  who are performing acceptably,
 Gives GAO permanent authority to offer voluntary early retirement opportunities and voluntary separation payments (buy-outs),
 Provides greater flexibility for reimbursing employees for relocation benefits,
 Allows certain employees and officers with less than three years of federal service to earn increased amounts of annual leave, and
 Authorizes an exchange program with private sector organizations.

References

Human Capital Reform Act
United States federal government administration legislation
Acts of the 108th United States Congress
United States federal legislation articles without infoboxes